Harpley is a hamlet in Worcestershire, England.

Hamlets in Worcestershire